Captain George Sitwell Campbell Swinton  (10 May 1859 – 17 January 1937) was a long-serving Scottish politician and officer of arms.

Life and work

Swinton was born at 7 Darnaway Street on the Moray Estate in west Edinburgh, the second son of Archibald Campbell Swinton of Kimmerghame, Berwickshire, and Georgiana Caroline Sitwell, daughter of Sir George Sitwell, 2nd Baronet of Renishaw. In 1895 he married  Elizabeth Ebsworth OBE, daughter of E.H. Ebsworth of Gattonside.  The couple had one son and two daughters. Elizabeth was an accomplished singer and performed professionally later in life.

He studied art under Professor Herkomer and other masters.

Swinton was appointed a Sub-Lieutenant in the Haddington, Berwick, Linlithgow and Peebles Artillery on 7 February 1877 (which commission he resigned on 11 May 1878), gazetted to the 71st (Highland) Regiment of Foot in May 1878, promoted to lieutenant on 23 January 1881, to captain on 11 September 1888, and retired in 1893. He was an extra Aide-de-Camp to the Marquess of Lansdowne when he was Viceroy of India from 1888 to 1894. In January 1900 he was appointed temporary Staff Captain at Army Headquarters.

Swinton was also the unsuccessful Conservative candidate for Paisley in 1900. He was a Member of London County Council representing Holborn from 1901 to 1907 and Dulwich from 1922 to 1928. He was Chairman of the Parks and Open Spaces Committee in 1904–1905, and Chief Whip of the Municipal Reform Party (the Conservative group on the council) from 1903 to 1912. He was an Alderman from 1907 to 1912, and 1920 to 1922. He became Chairman of the London County Council in 1912, but resigned on accepting the post of Chairman of the Town-planning Committee of the new Imperial City of Delhi. He was attached by the Colonial Office to the Representatives of the Overseas Dominions attending the Imperial Conferences in 1917 and 1918; foreshadowed, in August 1917, the Scottish National War Memorial in Edinburgh Castle; Honorary Secretary of the Scottish National War Memorial Committee, 1918.

Swinton was appointed a Deputy Lieutenant for the County of London in 1926. He was appointed a Commander of the Order of the British Empire (CBE) in January 1928.

Swinton also served as March Pursuivant of Arms Extraordinary. He was Albany Herald of Arms in Ordinary from 1923 until 1926 and served Lord Lyon King of Arms and Secretary to the Order of the Thistle from 1927 until 1929.

Swinton is the grandfather of Major-General Sir John Swinton and great-grandfather of actress Tilda Swinton.

Publications 
A Garden Road; Development; London: Her Traffic, Her Improvement, and Charing Cross Bridge; several papers on social subjects, the problems of traffic, and the improvement of London.

Arms

See also
 Heraldry
 Court of the Lord Lyon

Notes

External links 
 Portrait by John Singer Sargent of Mrs George Swinton in The Art Institute of Chicago

1859 births
1937 deaths
Military personnel from Edinburgh
Commanders of the Order of the British Empire
71st Highlanders officers
Conservative Party (UK) parliamentary candidates
Deputy Lieutenants of the County of London
Highland Light Infantry officers
Members of London County Council
Municipal Reform Party politicians
Politicians from Edinburgh
Scottish genealogists
Lord Lyon Kings of Arms